Welwyn is a village and civil parish in Hertfordshire, England.

Welwyn may also relate to:
 Places
 Welwyn
 Welwyn North railway station
 Welwyn Tunnel rail crash
 Welwyn RFC, a rugby football club
 Welwyn Roman Baths, an archaeological site
 Welwyn Garden City, a town within the Borough of Welwyn Hatfield in Hertfordshire, England
 Welwyn Garden City F.C., a football club
 Welwyn Garden City Hockey Club
 Welwyn Garden City railway station
 Welwyn Garden City rail crashes
 Borough of Welwyn Hatfield, a local government district in Hertfordshire, England
 Grade II* listed buildings in Welwyn Hatfield
 Welwyn Hatfield Borough Council
 Welwyn Hatfield Borough Council elections
 Welwyn Hatfield District Council election, 1998
 Welwyn Hatfield District Council election, 1999
 Welwyn Hatfield District Council election, 2000
 Welwyn Hatfield District Council election, 2002
 Welwyn Hatfield District Council election, 2003
 Welwyn Hatfield District Council election, 2004
 Welwyn Hatfield District Council election, 2006
 Welwyn Hatfield Borough Council election, 2007
 Welwyn Hatfield Borough Council election, 2008
 Welwyn Hatfield Borough Council election, 2012
 Welwyn Hatfield Borough Council elections 2012
 Welwyn Hatfield Borough Council election, 2014
 Welwyn Hatfield (UK Parliament constituency), in Hertfordshire, England
 Welwyn Preserve, a nature reserve in New York State
 Welwyn, Saskatchewan, a community in Canada

 Other
 Welwyn Studios, a film studio located in Welwyn Garden City 192850
 Welwyn Tool Group, a tool distribution company based in Welwyn Garden City

See also